Ahmed Dakli was an Albanian politician and mayor of Elbasan from 1937 through 1939.

References

Year of birth missing
Year of death missing
Mayors of Elbasan
Congress of Durrës delegates